Aleksandr Valeryevich Lipko (born 18 August 1975) is a Russian football official and a former player.

He is the director of sports for FC Nizhny Novgorod.

Honours 
 Russian Premier League champion: 1994, 1996.
 Russian Cup winner: 2004.
 Russian Cup finalist: 1996.

European competition history 
 UEFA Champions League 1994–95 with FC Spartak Moscow: 2 games.
 UEFA Champions League 1995–96 with FC Spartak Moscow: 2 games.
 UEFA Cup 1996–97 with FC Spartak Moscow: 1 game.
 UEFA Intertoto Cup 1997 with FC Lokomotiv Nizhny Novgorod: 4 games.
 UEFA Cup 2004–05 with FC Terek Grozny: 4 games.

References 

1975 births
Sportspeople from Krasnodar
Living people
Russian footballers
Russia youth international footballers
Russia under-21 international footballers
Russian Premier League players
FC Spartak Moscow players
FC Shinnik Yaroslavl players
FC Rubin Kazan players
FC Akhmat Grozny players
FC Lokomotiv Nizhny Novgorod players
FC Salyut Belgorod players
FC Nizhny Novgorod (2007) players
Association football defenders
FC Spartak-2 Moscow players